Kathe Chitrakathe Nirdeshana Puttanna ( Story, screenplay, direction Puttanna) is a 2016 Indian Kannada-language comedy horror film directed by Srinivas Raju. It is a remake of the 2014 Telugu horror comedy, Geethanjali. It stars Komal Kumar and Priyamani in the lead roles whilst Pooja Gandhi features in a pivotal role. Arjun Janya composed the soundtrack and background score for the film.

Plot
Ravi Shankar a businessman rapes and kills Priyamani a bharathanatyam dancer after she slaps him when he asked her for one night sex and also rejects his marriage proposal before this. Using his influence he modified and make others believe that she committed suicide due to his boyfriend's sex torture. Priyamani returns as ghost to avenge her death. Parallel to this, her twin sister tries to make Ravi Shankar a lunatic (mental patient) for the same reason to avenge her sister's death. What will happen to Ravi Shankar in climax? forms the crux of the story.

Cast
 Komal Kumar 
 Priyamani 
 P. Ravi Shankar
 Doddanna
 Sadhu Kokila as Doctor
 Bullet Prakash
 Pooja Gandhi as Herself a Cameo appearance 
 Kuri Pratap
 Prashant Siddi
 Anirudh Balaji
Jaidev Mohan 
Srinivas Gowda 
Danny Kuttappa 
Dingri Nagaraj 
Mohan Juneja

Controversies
Since the title included the name "Puttanna", it was strongly referenced to the veteran film maker Puttanna Kanagal. However, the director Srinivasa Raju denied the reports which suspected the story line linked to the legendary director. Kanagal's wife Nagalakshmi raised an objection to the release of the film. She asked the director to show the film to her prior to its release to which the team agreed.

Apart from the title, the film's first trailer also kicked up controversy with Komal's character mocking several Kannada film stars and directors. To this Komal denied any involvement in such activities.

Music
Arjun Janya has composed 2 songs and the audio is released under Ashwini Media Networks banner.

Reception

Critical response 

Sunayana Suresh of The Times of India scored the film at 3.5 out of 5 stars and says ". P Ravi Shankar has an interesting role unlike his usual loud villainous characters and his scenes with Komal are a treat, for it is a battle of two good talents trying to outdo each other. However, it is Priya Mani who takes the cake, with an author-backed role." Shyam Prasad S of Bangalore Mirror scored the film at 3.5 out of 5 stars and says "Komal gives his best as if his life depended on this film. He is ably supported by the other cast. The real highlight is Priyamani in an uncommon role. If you are looking for fun, KCNP is the place to be."Vijaya Karnataka scored the film at 3.5 out of 5 stars and says "The cinematography and background music for the horror scenes is the Sakhat mix. Thus, those who have a hardened heart should watch movies. Komal stands by his cinema again. The cinema can be seen as a thrill experience with comedy."

Box office
Kathe Chitrakathe Nirdeshana Puttanna has completed 50 days of successful run at the box-office. Puttanna was the first Kannada film to complete 50 days run at the box-office in 2016. And became commercially successful at the box office.

References

External links
 
 

2016 films
2010s Kannada-language films
Indian comedy horror films
Kannada remakes of Telugu films
Films scored by Arjun Janya